Clifford "Cliff" Taylor is a former American judge who served on the Michigan Supreme Court from 1997 through 2009. He served as the Michigan Supreme Court's Chief Justice from 2005 through 2009. After his tenure as a judge, he joined the law firm of Miller, Canfield, Paddock & Stone and served as a visiting law professor at Ave Maria School of Law.

Michigan Supreme Court
Taylor was appointed to the court in 1997 by then-Governor John Engler, ran for election to the balance of the appointed term in 1998 and was reelected in 2000. He was chosen by his fellow justices to be the Chief Justice twice, in 2005 and 2007.

Wayne County Circuit Judge Diane Marie Hathaway defeated Justice Taylor in the 2008 Supreme Court election.

After Taylor's defeat in the election, the Court chose Marilyn Jean Kelly to succeed him as chief justice.

Personal
Taylor is a graduate of the University of Michigan and The George Washington University. He is chairman of the board of directors of the Mackinac Center for Public Policy. He is married to Lucille Taylor, with whom he has two sons.

References

Living people
University of Michigan alumni
George Washington University Law School alumni
Chief Justices of the Michigan Supreme Court
1942 births
Ave Maria School of Law faculty
Mackinac Center for Public Policy
Justices of the Michigan Supreme Court